Adrian Matei (born 29 February 1968) is a former Romanian football player.

Matei is one of the few footballers that played for the three great squads in Bucharest, Rapid, Dinamo and Steaua.

After he ended his playing career, Matei became a football manager but also embraced a television pundit career, working for Sport.ro. Besides football, Matei owns a restaurant in Bucharest.

Honours

Player
Dinamo București
Divizia A: 1989–90, 1991–92
Cupa României: 1989–90
Steaua București
Divizia A: 1996–97, 1997–98
Cupa României: 1996–97, 1998–99
Supercupa României: 1998

Coach
Minerul Lupeni
Divizia C: 2004–05

ACS Berceni
Liga III: 2012–13

Carmen București
 Liga IV – Bucharest: 2018–19

References

External links
 

1968 births
Living people
Footballers from Bucharest
Romanian footballers
Association football defenders
FC Rapid București players
Victoria București players
FC Dinamo București players
FC Sportul Studențesc București players
FC Steaua București players
FC Progresul București players
Liga I players
Liga I managers
Liga II managers
Romania international footballers
Romanian football managers
FCM Târgoviște managers
AFC Rocar București managers
FC Metaloglobus București managers
CS Luceafărul Oradea managers
FC Vaslui managers
Association football midfielders